John Furey (born April 13, 1951) is an American actor who has starred in film and on television. His film credits include Friday the 13th Part 2 (1981), Black Thunder (1998) and Land of the Free (1998). Outside of film, Furey has starred on several television series such as Queer as Folk (2001–05)

Career
In 1976, Furey made his acting debut on the television series The Blue Knight. The following year, he had guest roles in the television series Eight Is Enough and Rafferty, and starred in the television film Just a Little Inconvenience. In 1978, Furey had guest starred on Emergency!, Logan's Run, and CHiPs. In 1980, Furey portrayed Chuck in Island Claws and guest starred as Stewart in The Waltons.

In 1981, Furey portrayed Paul Holt in Friday the 13th Part 2. In 1983, Furey guest starred on Cheers and Hotel. The following year, Furey guest starred on Remington Steele. In 1985, Furey portrayed Stewart on Murder, She Wrote and Winston March III on Brothers. After several television guest appearances in the mid 1980s, Furey returned to film in 1989's Mutant on the Bounty.

Furey appeared on the soap opera All My Children as Lee Hawkins in 1998. From 2001-2005, Furey guest starred as Craig Taylor on Queer as Folk.

Personal life
He is married to actress Denise Galik. Furey's sister, Kathleen Furey, is an actress/casting director. She teaches teen acting courses in many places on Long Island, New York.

Filmography

Film

Television

External links
 

American male film actors
American male soap opera actors
American male television actors
1951 births
Living people
Place of birth missing (living people)